Charles Irving may refer to:
 Charles Irving (politician), British member of parliament for Cheltenham
 Charles Irving (surgeon), British surgeon and inventor
 Charles John Irving, British civil servant in the Malay Peninsula

See also